The Pärnu Leht was a short-lived newspaper published in the city of Pärnu, Estonia. It was first published on 1 October 1994 and was discontinued in the end of 1995.

References
corresponding article in the Estonian Wikipedia

Newspapers published in Estonia
Defunct newspapers published in Estonia
Mass media in Pärnu
1994 establishments in Estonia